Antonio Yosimar Lizarbe Merino (born 14 May 1988 in Lima) is a Peruvian footballer who currently plays for Universidad Técnica de Cajamarca.

Club career
Antonio Lizarbe started his career playing in the youth divisions of Sporting Cristal. In 2007, he was promoted to the first team. He debuted on 20 September 2007 in a match against Alianza Lima.

In 2008, Lizarbe was suspended for 6 months after he tested positive for cocaine in a drug test. In June 2010, he moved to Sport Boys.

Lizarbe currently plays for Universidad Técnica de Cajamarca.

External links
 Antonio Lizarbe at BDFA.com.ar 

1988 births
Living people
Footballers from Lima
Association football midfielders
Peruvian footballers
Sporting Cristal footballers
Sport Boys footballers
Universidad Técnica de Cajamarca footballers
Doping cases in association football